Husky Stadium is a stadium on the campus of Houston Christian University in Houston, Texas. It is used for American football, and is the home field for the Houston Christian Huskies football team.  The stadium is located near the corner of Beechnut and Fondren. Initial capacity is 5,000 with future construction phases to increase capacity. The stadium inaugural game held on September 6, 2014 was between the then-Houston Baptist Huskies and the McMurry War Hawks.

Stadium features

First phase for the stadium includes grandstands on the western side of the stadium with seating for 5,065 including 468 chairback seats.  A berm is located north of the northern end zone area. The stadium includes two press box sections, each measuring 12' x 71'. A covered camera deck is located between the two press box sections. An elevator tower at the rear of the grandstands provides access to the press box level. On the ground level, a combination ticket box office/concession building is located at the northern side of the grandstands. Concessions are also located at the southern side of the grandstands with restrooms located in between. Also included is a weight room for the Husky athletic programs. Dunham Field, the playing field, is an artificial surface consisting of a Desso iDNA surface. The playing field was installed prior to the 2013 season. It was used only as the Huskies' practice field in the initial season until the stadium was built prior to the 2014 season.

Donations and gifts

Donors who helped build the stadium include Bob & Janice McNair and Archie & Linda Dunham. The Dunham's donation was used to construct the field and practice facilities, so the field has been named Dunham Field. The McNairs donation was used to finish the stadium's seating, ticket office, and press box.

Year by year

Attendance records

Gallery

See also
 List of NCAA Division I FCS football stadiums

Footnotes

References

External links 

 

American football venues in Houston
College football venues
Houston Christian Huskies football
2014 establishments in Texas
Sports venues completed in 2014